Michelle Sarpong (born 2 December 1998) is a Ghanaian professional footballer who plays as a midfielder for Ghanaian Premier League side Accra Hearts of Oak.

Career 
Sarpong started his career with Accra Hearts of Oak's junior side Auroras FC who play in the Ghana Division Two League. He served as captain of the side until January 2019, when he was promoted by coach Kim Grant as he signed his first professional contract for Hearts of Oak ahead of the 2019 GFA Normalization Committee Special Competition.

On 31 March 2019, under the management of Kim Grant, Sarpong made his competitive debut as an 82nd-minute substitute for Kwadwo Obeng Junior in a 1–0 win against Dreams in the Ghana Premier League. He scored his debut goal by scoring the first goal in 4–0 victory over West African Football Academy. In his debut season, made an instant impact, played 13 out of 14 matches played in the competition, helping Hearts to finish in first place in Group A and qualify for the semi-finals. Due to an leg sprain injury, he played a limited 4 matches in the 2019–20 season as the league was cancelled due to the COVID-19 pandemic in Ghana.

Sarpong started the 2020–21 season on a good note by playing first 6 matches, starting in 4 of those. Most notable amongst those matches was his brace against Dreams FC on 13 December 2020, which helped Hearts to a 3–0 win and gave them their first victory of the season.

On 19 December 2020, he picked up an injury in their 2–1 victory over King Faisal Babes and had to stay on the touchline for the next 8 matches. He made a return on 24 February 2021 coming on as a late substitute for Patrick Razak in a 1–0 victory over Liberty Professionals.

On 7 March 2021, he came off the bench to score his third goal of the season scoring the final goal from an assist by Randy Ovouka in a 4–0 victory over West African Football Academy. He subsequently went on play in a number of matches mostly coming on from bench as Hearts won the league after a 12-year trophy drought. At the end of the season, Sarpong was part of the Hearts' team that won the domestic double by winning the 2021 Ghanaian FA Cup, after beating Ashanti Gold in the final via 8–7 penalty shootout after the match remained goalless after extra time.

Honours 
Hearts of Oak

 Ghana Premier League: 2020–21
Ghanaian FA Cup: 2021

References

External links 
 

Living people
1998 births
Ghanaian footballers
Association football midfielders
Accra Hearts of Oak S.C. players
Ghana Premier League players